The homosexual sports community in the United States, much like the LGBT community at large, has struggled with recognition, rights, and acceptance. This struggle for acceptance comes from both sport fan bases as well as from within the various sports organizations, associations, federations, etc. However, following the 1969 Stonewall riots there has been marginal and gradual improvement in the rights and acceptance of homosexual athletes coming out. In the past, an athlete who made the decision to come out was, in essence, committing career suicide, and would risk losing support from fans who come from more conservative or intolerant backgrounds. As such, there were no openly gay athletes in the United States until fairly recently.

Researcher Eric Anderson found "more openly gay runners and swimmers than football and baseball players." He then hypothesized that this occurred because gay men likely abandoned the more macho sports in favor of sports that were more accepting of homosexuality.  In 2006, a Sports Illustrated poll of roughly 1,400 professional athletes found that a majority would be willing to accept a gay teammate. Although an aggressive and often violent sport, professional hockey (NHL) athletes seemed to be the most accepting of such teammates as 80% of its players approved of having a gay teammate.

Nearly a quarter of those in the U.S. polled in a 2013 survey believe that openly gay athletes hurt sports in general, while over half think being openly gay hurts the athlete's career.

Individual sports
The study of the relationship between sports and homosexuality did not emerge until around the 1990s, when Brian Pronger and Michael Messner began interviewing athletes about their views on homosexuality. Neither researcher was able to find a male athlete who was openly gay and active competitors in both individual and team sports. They suggested that it was not that there were no such athletes during this period in time, but they were just too afraid to admit to it due to their teammates’ opposition to homosexuality. Messner reiterated this opposition in his 1992 study: “The extent of homophobia in the sports world is staggering. Males (in sports) learn early that to be gay, to be suspected of being gay, or even to be unable to prove one’s heterosexual status is not acceptable."

Golf
In 1996, Muffin Spencer-Devlin became the first LPGA player to come out as gay.

In 2018, Tadd Fujikawa came out as gay, becoming the first male professional golfer to do so.

Pool
In 1974, the LA Union Thursday Pool League was established as the first gay competitive pool league in the United States.

Squash
In 2018, Todd Harrity came out as gay, thus becoming the first openly gay professional male squash player in the world. At the time he was ranked No. 1 in the United States out of all male squash players.

Tennis
Tennis player Billie Jean King acknowledged her relationship with Marilyn Barnett when it became public in a May 1981 palimony lawsuit filed by Barnett, making Billie Jean the first prominent female professional athlete to come out.

Wrestling
In 1982, the West Hollywood Wrestling Club was organized as the first gay competitive wrestling team in the United States.

Team sports

Basketball
In 2002, Sue Wicks came out as gay, making her the first openly gay person playing in the WNBA.

In 2014, openly gay basketball player Jason Collins played for the Brooklyn Nets of the NBA, making him the first openly gay athlete to play in any of the four major North American professional sports leagues.

Flag football 
In 2002, the National Gay Flag Football League was founded.

Football 
In 1975, former football player David Kopay became the first professional athlete from a major team to come out.

Football player Alissa Wykes of the Philadelphia Liberty Belles became one of the first active American athletes to publicly come out as gay when she announced that she was a lesbian in an article in the December 2001/January 2002 edition of Sports Illustrated for Women.

In 2021, Carl Nassib came out as gay, making him the first openly gay player in the National Football League.

Hockey 
In 1985, the Los Angeles Blades was organized as the first gay hockey team in the United States.

In 2021, Canadian Luke Prokop, who was drafted by the Nashville Predators in the 2020 NHL Entry Draft, became the first active player signed to a National Hockey League contract to come out as gay.

Rugby 
In 1998, the Washington Renegades RFC was formed as the first gay rugby team in the United States.

Soccer 
In 2013, Robbie Rogers became the first openly gay man to compete in a top North American professional sports league when he played his first match for the LA Galaxy of Major League Soccer.

Some women professional soccer players have been openly gay while actively playing for an American team, such as Joanna Lohman and Megan Rapinoe.

See also

 Homosexuality in modern sports
 Transgender people in sports
 List of LGBT sportspeople
Training Rules, a documentary film

References

LGBT in the United States
United States
Sports in the United States